Irene Robertson (November 10, 1931 – October 28, 1994) was an American hurdler. She competed in the 80 metres hurdles at the 1956 Summer Olympics and the 1960 Summer Olympics.

References

External links
 

1931 births
1994 deaths
Athletes (track and field) at the 1956 Summer Olympics
Athletes (track and field) at the 1960 Summer Olympics
American female hurdlers
Olympic track and field athletes of the United States
Place of birth missing
20th-century American women